The Philippines men's national basketball team, commonly known as Gilas Pilipinas, is the basketball team representing the Philippines. The team is managed by the Samahang Basketbol ng Pilipinas (Basketball Federation of the Philippines or simply SBP).

The team won a bronze medal in the 1954 FIBA World Championship, the best finish by any team outside the Americas and Europe. Also, the team took a fifth-place finish in 1936 Summer Olympics, the best finish by a men's team outside the Americas, Europe and Oceania. The Philippines has the most wins in the Olympics among teams outside the Americas, Europe and Oceania.

Aside from the bronze medal at the FIBA World Cup and the fifth-place Olympic finish, the Philippines has won five FIBA Asia Cups (formerly known as the FIBA Asia Championship), four Asian Games men's basketball gold medals, eight SEABA Championships, all but two Southeast Asian Games men's basketball gold medals, and has the most titles in Southeast Asia Basketball Association men's championship, being considered as the powerhouse team in Southeast Asia and one of Asia's elite basketball teams. The country has also participated in six FIBA World Cups and seven Olympic Basketball Tournaments.

History

Early years

The Philippines first participated in international basketball in the Far Eastern Championship Games in 1913. The Philippines defeated China in what was the first international game in Asia. The Philippines won all but one (1921) championship until 1934. The games were not under the supervision of FIBA as the organization was founded in 1932.

The Basketball Association of the Philippines (BAP) was founded in 1936, and became a part of FIBA later that year. Also in the same year, the BAP sent a team nicknamed "the Islanders" that participated in the first Olympic basketball tournament in Berlin. With the tournament under a single-elimination round format from the third game onwards, the Philippines won their first three games only to face the United States in their fourth game. The USA doubled the Philippines' score as they advanced to the next round, and subsequently win the gold medal undefeated. The Philippines wound up fifth place, winning the rest of their games, in the best finish by a men's Asian team in Olympic basketball history. Aside from silver medalists Canada, the Philippines was the only other team that only had one loss in the tournament.

The Philippines returned to the 1948 Olympics in London. The team finished fourth of six teams in their group to be eliminated. The team wound up in twelfth place.

In the 1950s–1960s, the Philippines was among the best in the world, producing world-class players like Carlos Loyzaga, Lauro Mumar, Mariano Tolentino, Francisco Rabat and Edgardo Ocampo. In 1951, team won the inaugural Asian Games basketball tournament in New Delhi, India. The team finished ahead of Japan and four other teams to win the gold medal. On the next Asian Games in 1954 in Manila that served as a qualifiers for the World Championship later that year, the team finished first anew, beating out the Republic of China (Taiwan), Japan and South Korea in the final round.

In 1954 FIBA World Championship in Brazil, Loyzaga was a part of the Mythical Team selection, where the Philippines won the bronze medal. The Philippines finished second in their group behind Brazil and ahead of Paraguay to enter the final round, where the team lost against the US by only 13 points; only the loss against the US and two losses against Brazil were the Philippines' only losses in the world championship. To date, the Philippines' performance remains the best performance by an Asian team in the World Championship.

In the 1956 Olympics, the Philippines finished seventh. The team qualified to the quarterfinals, with only loss against the USA. However, the team lost all of their games against France, Uruguay and Chile in the quarterfinals. The Philippines defeated Chile in the seventh-place game to finish with a 4–4 record. Two years later, in the 1958 Asian Games in Tokyo, the Philippines won its third consecutive gold medal, finishing first in the final round.

The Philippines was grouped with Bulgaria, Puerto Rico and Uruguay in the 1959 FIBA World Championship. The team finished third, losing against Bulgaria and Puerto Rico, to crash out of the final round. The Philippines won all of the games in the classification round against the United Arab Republic (Egypt) and Canada to meet Uruguay for the eighth-place game. The team defeated Uruguay again to finish eighth. This would be the last tournament of Loyzaga and company.

Birth of the Asian championships
Starting in 1960, the Asian Basketball Championship was held to determine Asia's participants in the Olympics and the World Championships. Qualifying for the Asian Championship was by subzone, or by the ranking in the most recent tournament; in this case, with the Philippines being the strongest team in Southeast Asia, the country will qualify easily for the continental championship, even if they failed to qualify via rankings from the previous tournament. The inaugural Asian Championship was held in Manila.

With an Asian Championship, the Philippines qualified for the 1960 Olympics. In Rome, the Philippines did not qualify for the medal round, but did beat Spain in the preliminaries, ultimately finishing 11th out of 16 nations. The country was supposed to host the 1963 World Championship, but President Diosdado Macapagal refused to allow players from Yugoslavia and other communist countries to enter the country. This caused the Philippines, despite winning the Asian Championships, to qualify via a pre-Olympic tournament, in which they were unsuccessful.

In the fifth championship at Bangkok, the Philippines finished third, after a one-point loss against Japan, and an 86–95 loss against South Korea.

Creation of the Philippine Basketball Association
In 1975, after disputes with the Basketball Association of the Philippines (BAP), nine teams pulled out of BAP's jurisdiction and founded the professional Philippine Basketball Association (PBA), taking along all the best players with them. This caused the BAP to send weakened teams in the subsequent international tournaments, as professionals are not allowed to play. The Filipinos fail to defend their Asian championship in 1975, with India earning a shock blowout win to deny the Philippines a top-4 finish. The Chinese won the championship, beginning their unbeaten championship run that will last into 1983. The nationals were denied of a top 4 finish in the 1977 Asian Championship, losing this time to Malaysia. The Philippines then hosted the 1978 FIBA World Championship, losing all of the games via blowouts to finish last in the final round.

The NCC program (1980–1986)
To offset the loss of players of the PBA, the BAP delegated to businessman Eduardo Cojuangco, Jr. the formation of a team that will train together for several months, in essence, a club team unaffiliated with any league. The result was the Northern Cement basketball team coached by the American Ron Jacobs that had four naturalized players. In the 1982 Asian Games in New Delhi, the team finished fourth behind Korea, China and Japan. In the 1983 Asian Championship in Hong Kong, the Philippines forfeited their preliminary round games after a misunderstanding in the rules that caused the Philippines to play more than one naturalized player on the floor at the time. The Philippines, without their naturalized players, made short work of the classification round to finish in ninth place. The Northern Cement team won the 1985 Asian Championship in Kuala Lumpur, to qualify for the 1986 FIBA World Championship in Spain.

On February 22, 1986, the People Power Revolution erupted and forced president Ferdinand Marcos into exile. Cojuangco, a known ally of Marcos, also left the country, causing the team not to participate in the World Championship. The team did participate in the 1986 Asian Games, finishing third behind China and Korea.

Professional era 
In 1989, FIBA allowed professionals to play in their tournaments. This caused the BAP to have an agreement with the PBA in which the latter will form national teams for the Asian Games, while the former will do so in other tournaments. In the 1989 Southeast Asian Games, the BAP-sponsored team suffered a shock loss to Malaysia in the gold medal game, the only time the Philippines failed to win the gold medal at the Southeast Asian Games in which basketball was played.

In 1990, the Philippines sent an all-pro national team, coached by Robert Jaworski, to regain the country's basketball supremacy in the Asian Games but the team lost in the final against China and settled for a silver medal. The team includes 1990 PBA Most Valuable Player Allan Caidic and Samboy Lim, who were both selected in the Asian Games Mythical Five Selections.

In the 1991 Asian Championship in Kobe, Japan, the Philippines finished second in their preliminary round group behind China, but a loss against Japan caused their elimination, ending up in seventh place, when Jordan forfeited the game. In 1993, the Philippines failed to qualify in the quarterfinal groups, suffering losses against Korea (five points) and the UAE (four points) en route to an 11th-place finish.

In the 1994 Asian Games in Hiroshima, the Philippines, coached by the American Norman Black, sent in a team composed of PBA players and selected amateurs. The team finish second in the preliminary round, losing to Korea. The loss to Korea meant that the Philippines has to face China; despite losing, the Chinese had their slimmest winning margin in the tournament with nine points, en route to their gold medal. The Philippines were upended by the hosts Japan in the bronze medal game, losing by three points in overtime.

With no PBA players on the roster, the team on the 1995 Asian Championship in Seoul finished last in the preliminary round, but managed to win two games in the classification round to finish 12th out of 19 teams. The team that went to Riyadh for the ABC Championship 1997 did only marginally better; they still finished last in the preliminary round but topped the classification round group en route to a ninth-place finish.

In 1998, the PBA formed the Philippine Centennial Team coached by the American Tim Cone that captured the 21st William Jones Cup championship but finished with the bronze medal in the 1998 Asian Games held in Bangkok. The Filipinos faced their old nemesis Korea in the quarterfinals and were blown out by twenty points, which led them to face China in the semifinals anew. The result would be the same as four years earlier, with the Chinese winning by nine. The Filipinos won the bronze medal game though, against Kazakhstan.

In the 1999 Asian Championship in Fukuoka, Japan, the Philippines, with no PBA players on their roster, finished last in the preliminary round, and second in the classification round to finish 11th out of 15 teams. In Shanghai for the 2001 Asian Championship, the Philippines was suspended by FIBA due to leadership disputes at the BAP. This caused the country to miss their first Asian championship. By 2002, a compromise was sorted out, and the Philippines was allowed to participate in the 2002 Asian Games, coached by Jong Uichico.

In Busan, South Korea, the Philippines easily qualified for the quarterfinals, in which they are grouped with China, Japan and Chinese Taipei. The Philippines won by five points against Japan, and 14 points against Chinese Taipei. The game against China wasn't as close, with the Philippines losing by 41 points, but this assured that they won't have to face China in the semifinals. For the third consecutive time, the Filipinos and Koreans faced in the semifinals, with the same result: the Koreans won over the Philippines, this time by one point. Up by two points, Olsen Racela missed two free throws, that led to a Korean three-pointer at the buzzer to eliminate the Filipinos. The team would lose in the bronze medal game against Kazakhstan by 2 points as Korea defeated China in overtime by a basket to win Asian Games gold for the first time since 1970.

With no PBA players in the roster, the 2003 Asian Championship in Harbin was the worst performance by the team in history: a 15th-place finish out of 16 teams. Unlike in 1997 and 1999, the Philippines had one win in the preliminary round (against Jordan). However, in the classification round, the Philippines emerged winless in a group containing Syria, Kuwait and Hong Kong. Only a blowout win against Malaysia saved the Philippines from dropping to the cellar. After the championship, BAP was heavily criticized and took steps to strengthen the team. However, after a loss against the Parañaque Jets, a team composed of politicians, actors and amateurs, by the BAP-managed team, another leadership crisis in the BAP ensued which caused another suspension from FIBA. As a result, the Philippines was not able to participate in the 2005 FIBA Asia Championship and the 2006 Asian Games.

SBP era (2007–present)

Team Pilipinas (2007–2009)
After the conclusion of the leadership struggle that saw the Samahang Basketbol ng Pilipinas (SBP), an organization backed by the PBA among others, being recognized by both FIBA and the Philippine Olympic Committee, the Philippines was reinstated by FIBA. San Miguel-Team Pilipinas was hastily assembled for the 2007 FIBA Asia Championship in Tokushima. The team defeated China, which didn't send its best team since they already qualified for the 2008 Olympics, but lost to Iran and Jordan to bow out of contention. The Filipinos and Chinese met again for the ninth place game in which the Filipinos won by two points. The Philippines qualified for the 2009 FIBA Asia Championship in Tianjin. The Philippines advanced to the quarterfinals to meet Jordan. The Jordanians raced to an early lead where the Filipinos never recovered to win the game. The Filipinos and the Koreans played for seventh place, which saw the Koreans winning by two points.

Gilas Pilipinas (2010–present)
Following the Northern Cement model of the 1980, the SBP established the Smart Gilas Pilipinas program, backed by SBP President Manuel V. Pangilinan, as a developmental team that aims to qualify in the 2012 Olympics. In the 2010 Asian Games, the Filipinos met the Korean team anew in the quarterfinals and was eliminated. In the 2011 championship at Wuhan, the SBP successfully petitioned the naturalization of Marcus Douthit; the team progressed up to the semifinals for the first time since 1987. Meeting Jordan, the team lost, never recovering after a third quarter run by the Jordanians. In the bronze medal game against Korea with a berth to an Olympic qualifying tournament at stake, the team raced to an early lead, but the Koreans cut the lead and eventually won the game after the Filipinos missed free-throws at the end game. Despite missing an Olympic berth, Smart Gilas' performance was the best finish in the championship since 1987, and the best finish in any major Asian competition since 2002.

After failing to qualify for the Olympics, the SBP decided to form the next edition of Smart Gilas Pilipinas team (Smart Gilas Pilipinas 2.0) composed of PBA players. The Smart Gilas Pilipinas program was renamed Gilas Pilipinas in 2013, still sponsored by Smart Communications. The national team played in the 2013 FIBA Asia Championship which was hosted at home. After losing to Chinese Taipei in the last game of the preliminary round to finish second, the team won four consecutive games to set up a semifinal against the Koreans. In a close game, the Philippines pulled away late in the game to win 86–79. The win sent the team to the finals and guaranteed qualification to the FIBA Basketball World Cup (new name of the FIBA World Championship) for the first time since 1978. The Philippines, appearing in the first FIBA Asia Championship final since the introduction of a championship game in 1987, lost by 14 points against undefeated Iran in the final to settle for a silver medal.

The Congress of the Philippines naturalized Andray Blatche in time for the 2014 FIBA Basketball World Cup to beef-up its center position. With Blatche in tow, the Philippines nearly won four tightly fought games against higher ranked teams of Croatia, Greece, Argentina and Puerto Rico, before winning in overtime against Senegal to record its first victory at the World Cup in 40 years. In the 2014 Asian Games, Blatche was not able to join the squad due to residency requirements by the Olympic Council of Asia and Douthit suit up as the national team's naturalized player instead. The Philippines finished seventh, its worst finish in the Asian Games.

On October 30, 2014, the SBP announced the formation of two selection committees to search and appoint the coach and players of future Philippine teams – for elite level and for youth level tournaments. Chot Reyes remained coach until a replacement was decided. The new roster aims to compete in the 2015 FIBA Asia Championship in China which will serve as the Asian qualifiers of the 2016 Summer Olympics Basketball tournament in Rio de Janeiro.

On December 23, 2014, Tab Baldwin was formally announced as the new coach of the Philippine national team. Baldwin's four-year tenure as coach officially began on January 1, 2015. The team captured the silver medal in the 2015 William Jones Cup but fell short of the gold medal in the 2015 FIBA Asia Championship. However, the Philippines qualified for the 2016 FIBA World Olympic Qualifying Tournament but the team failed in their bid to Rio Olympics losing to France and New Zealand.

The team won gold during 2016 SEABA Cup and a qualifying slot in the 2016 FIBA Asia Challenge.  However, as they were represented by the Gilas Cadets with no professional or naturalize players, the team suffered its worst performance placing 9th over-all, a very huge setback due to conflicting schedule with the national league and mismanagement of the SBP. In October 2016, Chot Reyes returned as head coach. In 2017, the Philippines hosted the 2017 SEABA Championship and the team swept the competition for the gold medal and the lone spot in the sub-zone for the 2017 FIBA Asia Cup. During the 2017 FIBA Asia Cup, the national team would sweep the group stage consisting of teams from China, Iraq and Qatar. The team failed to advance in the quarterfinals however and finished the tournament in seventh place. The Philippines defended their gold medal for the 12th straight time in the 2017 South East Asian Games beating Indonesia in the finals.

FIBA introduced a qualification process which does not involve the continental tournaments for the 2019 FIBA Basketball World Cup. The Philippines' qualification bid was marred by a brawl during the team's July 2018 tie against Australia in the first round of the Asian qualifiers. The incident caused suspensions for some of the players and coaches as well as a fine for SBP. Chot Reyes, who served suspension due to his involvement in the brawl was also replaced by Yeng Guiao. That game and incident started a slump in the standings that almost eliminated the Philippines from the World Cup, but under Guiao they managed to qualify in the last matchday by beating Kazakhstan, combined with a Lebanon loss to South Korea. The 2019 FIBA Basketball World Cup saw the Philippines with a 0–5 record, the country's worst performance since the 1978 edition, losing four of its five games in a blowout. This was due to lack of preparations and key players begging off from the team, as well as injuries. Due to the disappointing results, the SBP sent an all-professional team for the 2019 South East Asia Games to re-establish its dominance.  The national team swept the competition for their 18th Gold Medal in the tournament.

The 2021 FIBA Asia Cup qualifiers saw the country win all of its six games, including two victories over South Korea. The team also played at one of the 2020 FIBA Men's Olympic Qualifying Tournaments in Belgrade, Serbia. In the 2022 FIBA Asia Cup, the team finished third in its group, being defeated by Lebanon and New Zealand. The team was then eliminated in the first round by Japan, finishing the tournament in ninth place.

The country will co-host the 2023 FIBA Basketball World Cup with Japan and Indonesia. Despite being automatically qualified as co-hosts, the Philippines is also set to compete at the tournament's Asian Qualifiers by virtue of qualifying for the Asia Cup.

FIBA suspensions

1963
In 1963, FIBA suspended the Philippines for its failure to stage the 1963 FIBA World Championship after Philippine president Diosdado Macapagal refused to allow players from Yugoslavia and other communist countries to enter the country. Later, the Philippines, despite being the Asian champion, was forced to play in a pre-Olympic tournament in order to qualify for the 1964 Summer Olympics.

2001
The leadership crisis in the Basketball Association of the Philippines (BAP) worsened after a lengthy feud between the group of Graham Lim and Tiny Literal and the group of Freddie Jalasco and Lito Puyat which resulted in the suspension of the BAP. After a few months, FIBA intervened and ordered an election which resulted in Literal's victory as the president of the BAP. The suspension was quickly lifted and the Philippines was able to compete in the Southeast Asian Games in Malaysia.

2005–2007
The Philippines was again suspended in July 2005 after a long-standing feud between the BAP and the Philippine Olympic Committee (POC).

The conflict began on April 10, 2005, when the BAP-sponsored Cebuana-Lhuillier Philippine National team (composed of little-known amateur players) lost to a lowly Parañaque Jets team (made up of showbiz personalities) in a National Basketball Conference (NBC) pre-season tournament at the Rizal Memorial Coliseum. Upon hearing the news, POC president Jose Cojuangco, Jr. called for improvements in the national team, most notably, in the sending of a new team made up of players from the Philippine Basketball Association (PBA).

The PBA, together with the Philippine Basketball League (PBL), the UAAP and the NCAA, reportedly came to an agreement on the formation of a new national team. The POC, through a vote, first suspended, then in a later meeting, expelled the BAP as the official National Sports Association (NSA) for basketball and installed a new member in the Philippine Basketball Federation. The BAP, under new president Joey Lina, said that the expulsion was unconstitutional in the by-laws of the POC.

In hopes of securing a long-term solution, the FIBA ordered the PBA, PBL, UAAP, NCAA and Joey Lina (as an individual – or in Lina's claim, as a representative of the BAP) to form a new constitution or form of a new basketball body. By March 2006, the four stakeholders (PBA, PBL, UAAP and NCAA) signed an agreement to propose a new basketball body (Pilipinas Basketball). Lina refused to sign the memorandum, citing "unbalanced factors" that was put in the draft. After the four stakeholders met with Baumann in South Korea, the suspension was not lifted and the draft for a new body was not accepted since Lina was not in agreement. After several meetings between Baumann and the officials of the BAP and Pilipinas Basketball in Geneva and Bangkok, a Unity Congress was held. The BAP and Pilipinas Basketball agreed to merge, creating the Samahang Basketbol ng Pilipinas (SBP) as the new national basketball federation. The POC recognized the SBP as the new national governing body for basketball, after which the FIBA finally lifted the almost two-year-old suspension it imposed upon the country.

Nickname

The first Philippine team that competed in the 1936 Olympic Games were known as "the Islanders". After the Philippines became a republic in 1946, the national team was simply referred to by the press as the "RP 5" or "RP team" ("RP" standing for "Republic of the Philippines").

When the Northern Cement basketball team represented the Philippines from 1983 to 1985, the team was referred to as the "NCC" team. After the disbandment of the NCC team in 1986, the national team referred to as "RP 5" or "RP team" once again.

In the 1990 Asian Games, following the example of the first U.S. Dream Team, the Philippine team was referred to the "Philippines Dream Team", as this was the first national team with PBA players. Later, it was referred to as "Team Philippines". Eventually, "Team Philippines" became the name used to refer to the entire Philippine contingent in multi-sports events such as the Asian and Olympic Games.

During the Philippine Centennial in 1998, the team was officially known as the Philippine Centennial Team.

From 2005 to 2009, Team Pilipinas represented the men's basketball team – the team was initiative of the PBA and sponsored by San Miguel Corporation (2005–2007, named "San Miguel-Team Pilipinas") and Coca-Cola Bottlers Philippines, Inc. (2009, named "Powerade-Team Pilipinas").

In 2010, the Smart Gilas Pilipinas and Sinag Pilipinas programs replaced the Team Pilipinas program. Sinag Pilipinas represents the country in regional competitions such as the Southeast Asian Games and SEABA Championship. Smart Communications is the main sponsor of both programs. Gilas is a Filipino word that loosely translates into English as "prowess", and sinag translates as "ray" (sunlight). The name Gilas was adopted from the mascot of the 2005 Southeast Asian Games held in Manila, Philippines which is an eagle. The mascot was designed by Filipino sports journalist Danny Simon.

In 2013, the Smart brand was dropped from the branding of both programs, although Smart Communications remained as the main sponsor. In 2015, the Sinag Pilipinas program was renamed into as the "Gilas Cadets".

In Dec. 2016, The Gilas Pilipinas program got a big boost as a new backer in Chooks-to-Go to form partnership with Smart Communications in the united effort in supporting the Pinoy cagers in their quest for international glory. The team carry that name when participated in 2017 international games.

The squad that participated in the 2018 Asian Games in particular prefers to call themselves as Rain or Shine-Philippines (RoS-Philippines), Gilastopainters or simply Team Pilipinas due to the core of the team being composed of Rain or Shine Elasto Painters players instead of the Gilas nickname. The squad was standing in for the Chot Reyes-led roster which had many of its players as well as Reyes himself suspended due to their involvement in the Philippines-Australia brawl.

Gilas Pilipinas continued to be used to refer to the men's national team. In May 2019, the Samahang Basketbol ng Pilipinas formally adopted the Gilas Pilipinas name for the country's women's, youth, and 3x3 national teams as well as part of a larger rebrand and restructuring.

Uniform

The national colors of blue, white and red have been used in national team uniforms throughout history. Most teams used a blue uniform as the dark-colored uniform, and a white uniform for light-colored uniform. Red was occasionally used as a tertiary color. In the 2002 Asian Games, the dark-colored uniform was a red one. The SBP has consistently used the blue and white uniform as dark and light uniforms, respectively. Nike has been the official outfitter of the national team ever since the SBP took over. In the 2013 Asian Championship, the color white has been used to identify the team with the fans.

It usually uses a distinct coat of arms, as seen above, distinct from the SBP (or BAP) logo, or the official coat of arms.

Manufacturer
1991–1997: Adidas
1998: Fila
2002: Adidas
2003–2006: Accel
2006–present: Nike

Fixtures and results

Competitions

Olympic Games

FIBA World Olympic Qualifying Tournament

FIBA Basketball World Cup

FIBA Asia Cup

FIBA Asia Challenge

Asian Games

Southeast Asian Games

SEABA Championship

SEABA Cup

Far Eastern Championship Games

Other tournaments

William Jones Cup
Note: The list only includes those that are participated by the national team.  Other teams representing the country are excluded.

Team

Roster
Competition: 2023 FIBA Basketball World Cup qualification
Opposition: Jordan (February 27, 2023)
Venue: Philippine Arena, Bocaue

Past rosters
Note: Olympics, World Championships, Asian Games, Asian Championships only.

Coaches

See also

Philippines women's national basketball team
Philippines men's national under-19 basketball team
Philippines men's national under-17 basketball team
Philippines men's national basketball team in FIBA club tournaments
San Miguel-Team Pilipinas basketball team
Philippine Centennial Team
Northern Cement basketball team
Basketball in the Philippines
Samahang Basketbol ng Pilipinas
Philippine Basketball Association

References

External links

SBP Official website
PBA Official website
New PBA Official website
Philippine Basketball Team News Roster Profile Updates
Philippine Olympic Committee Website
FIBA profile
Smart Gilas Basketball News and Updates
Team Pilipinas News Update Site

 
1913 establishments in the Philippines
 
national
Men's national basketball teams